Rustem Radikovich (in other sources - Radinovich) Shaymukhametov (born 10 March 1960) is a Russian professional football coach and a former player.

Club career
He made his Russian Premier League debut for FC Tekstilshchik Kamyshin on 29 March 1992 in a game against FC Dynamo-Gazovik Tyumen. He also played at the top tier in 1993.

External links
 

1960 births
Living people
Soviet footballers
Russian footballers
Association football midfielders
FC Neftyanik Ufa players
FC Rotor Volgograd players
FC Tekstilshchik Kamyshin players
FC Sodovik Sterlitamak players
FC Energiya Volzhsky players
Russian Premier League players
Russian expatriate footballers
Expatriate footballers in Germany
Russian football managers